Psacothea hilaris, the yellow spotted longicorn beetle, is a species of beetle in the family Cerambycidae. It was described by Francis Polkinghorne Pascoe in 1857. It is known from North Korea, China and Japan. It has been introduced to Italy.

Subspecies
 Psacothea hilaris botelensis Ohbayashi & Ohbayashi, 1965
 Psacothea hilaris hilaris (Pascoe, 1857)
 Psacothea hilaris insularis Hayashi, 1957
 Psacothea hilaris intermedia Breuning & Ohbayashi, 1966
 Psacothea hilaris iriomotensis Hayashi, 1969
 Psacothea hilaris ishigakiana Ohbayashi & Ohbayashi, 1956
 Psacothea hilaris macronotata Hayashi, 1956
 Psacothea hilaris maculata Breuning, 1954
 Psacothea hilaris miyakejimana Matsushita, 1937
 Psacothea hilaris miyakoana Ohbayashi & Ohbayashi, 1956
 Psacothea hilaris tenebrosa Matsushita, 1933
 Psacothea hilaris yonaguniana Ohbayashi & Ohbayashi, 1956

References

Lamiini
Beetles described in 1857